Pages of Life is a 1922 silent British drama film directed by Adelqui Migliar and starring Evelyn Brent. The film is considered to be lost.

Cast
 Evelyn Brent as Mitzi / Dolores
 Richard Turner as Valerius
 Jack Trevor as Lord Mainwaring
 Sunday Wilshin as Phyllis Mainwaring

References

External links

1922 films
1922 drama films
British drama films
British silent feature films
British black-and-white films
Films directed by Adelqui Migliar
Lost British films
1922 lost films
Lost drama films
1920s British films
Silent drama films